Pieter Willem Botha,  (12 January 1916 – 31 October 2006), commonly known as P. W. and  (The Big Crocodile), was a South African politician. He served as the last prime minister of South Africa from 1978 to 1984 and the first executive state president of South Africa from 1984 to 1989.

First elected to Parliament in 1948, Botha was an outspoken opponent of black majority rule and international communism. However, his administration did make concessions towards political reform, whereas internal unrest saw widespread human rights abuses at the hands of the government. Botha resigned as leader of the ruling National Party (NP) in February 1989 after suffering a stroke and six months later was also coerced to leave the presidency.

In F. W. de Klerk's 1992 apartheid referendum, Botha campaigned for a No vote and denounced De Klerk's administration as irresponsible for opening the door to black majority rule. In early 1998, when Botha refused to testify at the Mandela government's Truth and Reconciliation Commission (TRC), he was supported by the Conservative Party, which had earlier contested his rule as the official opposition. For his refusal, he was fined and given a suspended jail sentence. The sentence was overturned on appeal.

Early life and education
Pieter Willem Botha was born on a farm in the Paul Roux district of the Orange Free State Province (now Free State Province), the son of Afrikaner parents. His father, Pieter Willem Botha Sr., fought as a commando against the British in the Second Boer War. His mother, Hendrina Christina Botha (née de Wet), was interned in a British concentration camp during the war.
 
Botha initially attended the Paul Roux School and matriculated from Bethlehem Voortrekker High School. In 1934, he entered the Grey University College (now the University of the Free State) in Bloemfontein to study law, but left early at the age of twenty in order to pursue a career in politics. He began working for the National Party as a political organiser in the neighbouring Cape Province. In the run-up to World War II, Botha joined the Ossewabrandwag, an Afrikaner nationalist group which was sympathetic to the German Nazi Party; but months after the German attack on the USSR, Botha condemned the Ossewabrandwag and changed his ideological allegiance to Christian nationalism.

In 1943, Botha married Anna Elizabeth Rossouw (Elize). The couple had two sons and three daughters.

Parliamentary career
At age 30, Botha was elected head of the National Party Youth in 1946, and two years later was elected to the House of Assembly as representative of George in the southern Cape Province in the general election which saw the beginning of the National Party's 46-year tenure in power. His opponent in the 1948 election was JP Marais from the United Party. In 1958 Botha was appointed Deputy Minister of Internal Affairs by Hendrik Verwoerd, and in 1961 was appointed to the new Department of Coloured Affairs and became Minister of Community Development. In 1966, Botha was appointed Minister of Defence by Verwoerd and served under the government of John Vorster, upon Verwoerd's murder later that year. Under his 14 years in charge of the ministry, the South African Defence Force (SADF) reached a zenith, at times consuming 20% of the national budget, compared to 1.3% in 1968, and was involved in the South African Border War. When Vorster resigned following allegations of his involvement in the Muldergate Scandal in 1978, Botha was elected as his successor by the National Party caucus, besting the electorate's favourite, 45-year-old Foreign Minister Pik Botha. In the final internal ballot, he beat Connie Mulder, the scandal's namesake, in a 78–72 vote.

Botha was keen to promote constitutional reform, and hoped to implement a form of federal system in South Africa that would allow for greater "self-rule" for black homelands (or Bantustans), while still retaining the supremacy of a white central government, and foremost expand the rights of Coloureds (South Africans of mixed ancestry) and Asians in order to widen support for the government. Upon enacting the reforms, he remarked in the House of Assembly; "We must adapt or die."

Upon becoming Prime Minister, Botha retained the defence portfolio until October 1980, when he appointed SADF Chief General Magnus Malan, his successor. From his ascension to the cabinet, Botha pursued an ambitious military policy designed to increase South Africa's military capability. He sought to improve relations with the West – especially the United States – but with mixed results. He argued that the preservation of the apartheid government, though unpopular, was crucial to stemming the tide of African Communism, which had made in-roads into neighbouring Angola and Mozambique after these two former Portuguese colonies obtained independence.

As Prime Minister and later State President, Botha's greatest parliamentary opponents were Harry Schwarz and Helen Suzman of the Progressive Federal Party until 1987, when his former cabinet colleague Andries Treurnicht's new Conservative Party became the official opposition on a strictly anti-concessionist agenda.

In 1977, as Minister of Defence, Botha began a secret nuclear weapons program, which culminated in the manufacture of six nuclear bombs, destroyed only in the early 1990s. He remained steadfast in South Africa's administration of neighbouring territory South-West Africa, particularly while there was a presence of Cuban troops in Angola to the north. Botha was responsible for introducing the notorious Koevoet police counter-insurgency unit. He was also instrumental in building the SADF's strength, adding momentum to establishing units such as 32 Battalion. South African intervention, with support of the rebel UNITA movement (led by Dr. Jonas Savimbi, a personal friend), in the Angolan Civil War continued until the late 1980s, terminating with the Tripartite Accord. To maintain the nation's military strength, a very strict draft was implemented to enforce compulsory military service for white South African men.

State President

In 1983, Botha proposed a new constitution, which was then put to a vote of the white population. Though it did not implement a federal system as established in 1961, it implemented what was ostensibly a power-sharing agreement with Coloureds and Indians. The new constitution created two new houses of parliament alongside the existing, white-only House of Assembly—the House of Representatives for Coloureds and the House of Delegates for Indians. The three chambers of the new Tricameral Parliament had sole jurisdiction over matters relating to their respective communities. Legislation affecting "general affairs," such as foreign policy and race relations, had to pass all three chambers after consideration by joint standing committees.

The plan included no chamber or system of representation for the black majority. Each Black ethno-linguistic group was allocated a 'homeland' which would initially be a semi-autonomous area. However, blacks were legally considered citizens of the Bantustans, not of South Africa, and were expected to exercise their political rights there. Bantustans were expected to gradually move towards a greater state of independence with sovereign nation status being the final goal. During Botha's tenure, Ciskei, Bophutatswana and Venda all achieved nominal nationhood. These new countries, set up within the borders of South Africa, never gained international recognition, and economically all remained heavily dependent on South Africa. Over half of the Bantustans, most notably KwaZulu led by Mangosuthu Buthelezi, rejected independence due to their leaders' commitment to opposing Apartheid from within.

The new constitution also changed the executive branch from the parliamentary system that had been in place in one form or another since 1910, to a presidential system. The prime minister's post was abolished, and its functions were merged with those of the state president, which became an executive post with sweeping powers. He was elected by an electoral college whose members were elected by the three chambers of the Parliament. The state president and cabinet had sole jurisdiction over "general affairs." Disputes between the three chambers regarding "general affairs" were resolved by the President's Council, composed of members from the three chambers and members directly appointed by the state president. In practice, the composition of the President's Council and the electoral college made it impossible for the Coloured and Indian chambers to outvote the white chamber on any substantive matter, even if they voted as a bloc. Thus, the real power remained in white hands—and in practice, in the hands of Botha's National Party, which commanded a large majority in the white chamber.

Though the new constitution was criticised by the black majority for failing to grant them any formal role in government, many international commentators praised it as a "first step" in what was assumed to be a series of reforms. On 14 September 1984, Botha was elected as the first state president under the newly approved constitution.

Implementing the presidential system was seen as a key step in consolidating Botha's personal power. In previous years, he had succeeded in getting a number of strict laws that limited freedom of speech through parliament, and thus suppressed criticism of government decisions.

In many western countries, such as the United States, the United Kingdom (where the Anti-Apartheid Movement was based) and the Commonwealth, there was much debate over the imposition of economic sanctions in order to weaken Botha and undermine the white regime. By the late 1980s – as foreign investment in South Africa declined – disinvestment began to have a serious effect on the nation's economy.

Apartheid government

Botha undertook some superficial changes to apartheid practices. He legalised interracial marriage and miscegenation, both completely banned since the late 1940s. The constitutional prohibition on multiracial political parties was lifted. He also relaxed the Group Areas Act, which barred non-whites from living in certain areas. In 1988, a new law created "Open Group Areas" or racially mixed neighbourhoods but these neighbourhoods had to receive a Government permit, had to have the support of the local whites immediately concerned, and had to be an upper-class neighbourhood in a major city in order to be awarded a permit. In 1983, the aforementioned constitutional reforms granted limited political rights to "Coloureds" and "Indians". Botha also became the first South African government leader to authorise contacts with Nelson Mandela, the imprisoned leader of the African National Congress (ANC).

Even these meager reforms went too far for a group of NP hardliners, led by former Education Minister Andries Treurnicht. In 1982, the group broke away to form the Conservative Party. However, they did not even begin to meet the demands of the opposition. In the face of rising discontent and violence, Botha refused to cede political power to blacks and imposed greater security measures against anti-apartheid activists. Botha also refused to negotiate with the ANC.

In 1985, Botha delivered the Rubicon speech, a policy address in which he refused to give in to demands by the black population, including the release of Mandela. Botha's defiance of international opinion further isolated South Africa, leading to economic sanctions and a rapid decline in the value of the rand. The following year, when the United States introduced the Comprehensive Anti-Apartheid Act, Botha declared a nationwide state of emergency. He is famously quoted during this time as saying, "This uprising will bring out the beast in us".

As economic and diplomatic actions against South Africa increased, civil unrest spread amongst the black population, supported by the ANC and neighbouring black-majority governments. On 16 May 1986, Botha publicly warned neighbouring states against engaging in "unsolicited interference" in South Africa's affairs. Four days later, Botha ordered air strikes against selected targets in Lusaka, Harare, and Gaborone, including the offices of exiled ANC activists. Botha charged that these raids were just a "first installment" and showed that "South Africa has the capacity and the will to break the [ANC]."

In spite of the concessions made by Botha, the apartheid years under his leadership were by far the most brutal. Thousands were detained without trial during Botha's presidency, while others were tortured and killed. The TRC found Botha responsible for gross violations of human rights. He was also found to have directly authorised "unlawful activity which included killing." Botha declined to apologise for apartheid. In a 2006 interview to mark his 90th birthday, he suggested that he had no regrets about the way he had run the country. Botha denied that he had ever considered black South Africans to be in any way inferior to whites, but conceded that "some" whites did hold that view. He also claimed that the racial segregation laws of apartheid "started in Lord Milner’s time" and the National Party merely inherited them; however, Botha conceded that the Afrikaner population had been "happy to perpetuate [apartheid]", as many of them "were, and some of them still are... 'racists at heart'".

Fall from power
State President Botha's loss of influence can be directly attributed to decisions taken at the Ronald Reagan/Mikhail Gorbachev summit of the leaders of the US and the Soviet Union in Moscow (29 May – 1 June 1988) that paved the way to resolving the problem of Namibia which, according to foreign minister Pik Botha, was destabilising the region and "seriously complicating" the major issue which South Africa itself would shortly have to face. Soviet military aid would cease and Cuban troops be withdrawn from Angola as soon as South Africa complied with UN Security Council Resolution 435 by relinquishing control of Namibia and allowing UN-supervised elections there. The Tripartite Agreement, which gave effect to the Reagan/Gorbachev summit decisions, was signed at UN headquarters in New York on 22 December 1988 by representatives of Angola, Cuba and South Africa.

On 18 January 1989, Botha (then aged 73) suffered a mild stroke which prevented him from attending a meeting with Namibian political leaders on 20 January 1989. Botha's place was taken by acting president J. Christiaan Heunis. On 2 February 1989, Botha resigned as leader of the National Party (NP), anticipating his nominee – finance minister Barend du Plessis – would succeed him. Instead, the NP's parliamentary caucus selected as leader education minister F. W. de Klerk, who moved quickly to consolidate his position within the party as a reformist, while hardliners supported Botha. In March 1989, the NP elected De Klerk as state president but Botha refused to resign, saying in a television address that the constitution entitled him to remain in office until March 1990 and that he was even considering running for another five-year term. Following a series of acrimonious meetings in Cape Town, and five days after UNSCR 435 was implemented in Namibia on 1 April 1989, Botha and De Klerk reached a compromise: Botha would retire after the parliamentary elections in September, allowing de Klerk to take over as state president.

However, Botha abruptly resigned from the state presidency on 14 August 1989, complaining that he had not been consulted by De Klerk over his scheduled visit to see President Kenneth Kaunda of Zambia:
"The ANC is enjoying the protection of president Kaunda and is planning insurgency activities against South Africa from Lusaka", Botha declared on nationwide television. He said he had asked the cabinet what reason he should give the public for abruptly leaving office. "They replied I could use my health as an excuse. To this, I replied that I am not prepared to leave on a lie. It is evident to me that after all these years of my best efforts for the National Party and for the government of this country, as well as the security of our country, I am being ignored by ministers serving in my cabinet."

De Klerk was sworn in as acting state president on 14 August 1989 and the following month was nominated by the electoral college to succeed Botha in a five-year term as state president. De Klerk soon announced the removal of legislation against anti-apartheid groups – including the African National Congress – and the release of Nelson Mandela. De Klerk's term saw the dismantling of the apartheid system and negotiations that eventually led to South Africa's first racially inclusive democratic elections on 27 April 1994.

In a statement on the death of Botha in 2006, De Klerk said:
"Personally, my relationship with P. W. Botha was often strained. I did not like his overbearing leadership style and was opposed to the intrusion of the State Security Council system into virtually every facet of government. After I became leader of the National Party in February 1989, I did my best to ensure that P. W. Botha would be able to end his term as president with full dignity and decorum. Unfortunately, this was not to be."

Retirement
Botha and his wife Elize retired to their home, Die Anker, in the town of Wilderness,  from the city of George and located on the Indian Ocean coast of the Western Cape. Elize died in 1997, and he later married Barbara Robertson, a legal secretary 25 years his junior, on 22 June 1998.

Botha remained largely out of sight of the media and it was widely believed that he remained opposed to many of F. W. de Klerk's reforms. He resigned from the Afrikaner Broederbond.

Botha refused to testify at the new government's Truth and Reconciliation Commission (TRC), set up to expose apartheid-era crimes and chaired by his cultural and political nemesis, Archbishop Desmond Tutu. The TRC found that he had ordered the 1988 bombing of the South African Council of Churches headquarters in Johannesburg. In August 1998, he was fined and given a suspended jail sentence for his refusal to testify on human rights violations and violence sanctioned by the State Security Council (SSC) which he, as president until 1989, had directed.

In June 1999, Botha successfully appealed to the High Court against his conviction and sentence. The Court's ruling by Judge Selikowitz (with Judge Foxcroft concurring) found that the notice served on Botha to appear before the TRC was technically invalid.

Death
Botha died of a heart attack at his home in Wilderness on Tuesday 31 October 2006, aged 90. His death was met with magnanimity by many of his former opponents. Former President Nelson Mandela was reported as saying "while to many Mr. Botha will remain a symbol of apartheid, we also remember him for the steps he took to pave the way towards the eventual peacefully negotiated settlement in our country".

President Thabo Mbeki announced that flags would be flown at half mast to mark the death of a former head of state. The offer of a state funeral was declined by Botha's family, and a private funeral was held on 8 November in the town of George, where Botha's body was buried. Mbeki attended the funeral.

Awards
 : Order of Propitious Clouds with Special Grand Cordon (1980)

References

Further reading

Botha's last interview before he died
The Mandela Document, dated prior to Mandela's release
"Fighter and Reformer: Extracts from the Speeches of P. W. Botha", Compiled by J.J.J. Scholtz, Published: Bureau for Information, Pretoria, 1989
The life and times of PW Botha – IOL
PW, Tambo 'partners in peace' – News24
'He was my bread and botha' (By artists) – Mail&Guardian
Zuma on PW: 'He saw the need for change' – Mail&Guardian
Thabo Mbeki on PW – Moneyweb

1916 births
2006 deaths
People from Dihlabeng Local Municipality
Afrikaner people
South African people of Dutch descent
Members of the Dutch Reformed Church in South Africa (NGK)
National Party (South Africa) politicians
State Presidents of South Africa
Prime Ministers of South Africa
Defence ministers of South Africa
Members of the House of Assembly (South Africa)
Apartheid government
South African anti-communists
South African collaborators with Nazi Germany
University of the Free State alumni
Heads of government who were later imprisoned
Burials in South Africa